A distributed transaction is a database transaction in which two or more network hosts are involved. Usually, hosts provide transactional resources, while the transaction manager is responsible for creating and managing a global transaction that encompasses all operations against such resources. Distributed transactions, as any other transactions, must have all four ACID (atomicity, consistency, isolation, durability) properties, where atomicity guarantees all-or-nothing outcomes for the unit of work (operations bundle).

Open Group, a vendor consortium, proposed the X/Open Distributed Transaction Processing (DTP) Model (X/Open XA), which became a de facto standard for behavior of transaction model components.

Databases are common transactional resources and, often, transactions span a couple of such databases. In this case, a distributed transaction can be seen as a database transaction that must be synchronized (or provide ACID properties) among multiple participating databases which are distributed among different physical locations. The isolation property (the I of ACID) poses a special challenge for multi database transactions, since the (global) serializability property could be violated, even if each database provides it (see also global serializability). In practice most commercial database systems use strong strict two phase locking (SS2PL) for concurrency control, which ensures global serializability, if all the participating databases employ it. (see also commitment ordering for multidatabases.)

A common algorithm for ensuring correct completion of a distributed transaction is the two-phase commit (2PC). This algorithm is usually applied for updates able to commit in a short period of time, ranging from couple of milliseconds to couple of minutes.

There are also long-lived distributed transactions, for example a transaction to book a trip, which consists of booking a flight, a rental car and a hotel. Since booking the flight might take up to a day to get a confirmation, two-phase commit is not applicable here, it will lock the resources for this long. In this case more sophisticated techniques that involve multiple undo levels are used. The way you can undo the hotel booking by calling a desk and cancelling the reservation, a system can be designed to undo certain operations (unless they are irreversibly finished).

In practice, long-lived distributed transactions are implemented in systems based on Web Services. Usually these transactions utilize principles of compensating transactions, Optimism and Isolation Without Locking. X/Open standard does not cover long-lived DTP.

Several technologies, including Enterprise Java Beans (EJBs) and Microsoft Transaction Server (MTS) fully support distributed transaction standards.

See also
 Java Transaction API (JTA)
 Enduro/X Open source X/Open XA and XATMI implementation

References

Further reading
 Gerhard Weikum, Gottfried Vossen, Transactional information systems: theory, algorithms, and the practice of concurrency control and recovery, Morgan Kaufmann, 2002, 

Data management
Transaction processing